Agra Road may refer to:
 Agra Road railway station
 Agra Road (film), a 1957 Bollywood film